Two pairs of lion sculpture are installed at the Utah State Capitol in Salt Lake City. The original statues were created by Gavin Jack with cement in 1915, and repaired by Ralphael Plescia in 1977. Replacements were sculpture by Nick Fairplay with Italian marble. The sculpture are known as Fortitude, Honor, Integrity, and Patience.

References

External links

 

Outdoor sculptures in Salt Lake City
Sculptures of lions
Statues in Utah